Council of Dads is an American drama television series inspired by the book The Council of Dads by Bruce Feiler, developed by Joan Rater and Tony Phelan, that premiered on NBC as part of the 2019–20 television season, on March 24, 2020. In June 2020, the series was canceled after one season.

Premise
Cancer patient Scott Perry worries about his five children growing up without his help and advice. He and his wife Robin recruit three friends to act as a "council of dads" to be father figures to his children.  Scott dies and his loved ones form an expanded chosen family.

Cast

Main
 Sarah Wayne Callies as Dr. Robin Perry, Scott's widow.
 Clive Standen as Anthony Lavelle, Scott's best friend, a chef and a member of the council of dads as well as Luly's biological father, unknown to Luly or the rest of the family.
 J. August Richards as Dr. Oliver Post, Robin's best friend since medical school and a member of the council of dads.
 Michele Weaver as Luly Perry, Scott's biracial daughter, whom he raised as a single father for eight years before meeting Robin.
 Emjay Anthony as Theo Perry, Scott and Robin's temperamental teenage son.
 Thalia Tran as Charlotte Perry, Scott and Robin's adopted daughter, who is of Chinese ancestry.
 Blue Chapman as JJ Perry, Scott and Robin's seven-year-old transgender son, who was assigned female at birth.
Steven Silver as Evan Norris, Luly's husband.
 Michael O'Neill as Larry Mills, Scott's Alcoholics Anonymous sponsee and a member of the council of dads.

Special guest stars
 Tom Everett Scott as Scott Perry

Recurring

 Lindsey Blackwell as Tess, Oliver and Peter's daughter
 Kevin Daniels as Peter Richards, Oliver's husband and Tess' other father
 Hilarie Burton as Margot

Episodes

Production

Development 
On January 14, 2019, it was announced that NBC had given the production a pilot order under the name Council of Dads. The pilot was written by Joan Rater and Tony Phelan who executive produces alongside Jerry Bruckheimer, Jonathan Littman, KristieAnne Reed and producers are James Oh, Bruce Feiler. Production companies involved with the pilot include Jerry Bruckheimer Television, Midwest Livestock Productions and Universal Television. On May 7, 2019, it was announced that the production had been given a series order. A few days later, it was announced that the series would premiere as a mid-season replacement in the spring of 2020. On January 11, 2020 it was announced that the series would premiere on March 10, 2020. On February 26, 2020, the premiere date was moved to March 24, 2020. On June 25, 2020, NBC canceled the series after one season.

Casting 
In February 2019, it was announced that Sarah Wayne Callies and Clive Standen had been cast in the pilot's lead roles. Alongside the pilot's order announcement, in March 2019 it was reported that Michael O'Neill, Steven Silver, and Emjay Anthony had joined the cast.

Filming 
The series was filmed in Savannah, Georgia.

Reception

Critical response

On Rotten Tomatoes, the series has an approval rating of 50% based on 10 reviews, with an average rating of 5.8/10. The website's critical consensus reads, "Council of Dads talented cast tries its best, but its first season is too superficial to make the emotional moves necessary to really connect." On Metacritic, it has a weighted average score of 53 out of 100 based on 5 reviews, indicating "mixed or average reviews".

Ratings

References

External links
 
 

2020 American television series debuts
2020 American television series endings
2020s American drama television series
2020s American LGBT-related drama television series
NBC original programming
Television shows based on non-fiction books
Television series about cancer
Television series about families
Television series by Universal Television
Television shows filmed in Georgia (U.S. state)
Television shows set in Savannah, Georgia
Transgender-related television shows